Golnam-e Olya (also Romanized as Golnām-e ‘Olyā; also known as Golnām and Gul Nūm) is a village in Naharjan Rural District, Mud District, Sarbisheh County, South Khorasan Province, Iran. At the 2006 census, its population was 129, in 40 families.

References 

Populated places in Sarbisheh County